Mateus Alberto Contreiras Gonçalves (born 7 March 1983), commonly known as Manucho, is an Angolan former professional footballer who played as a striker.

Manucho moved from Petro Atletico to Manchester United in January 2008. Before playing a game for United, however, he was loaned out to Greek side Panathinaikos for the remainder of the 2007–08 season, due to issues with obtaining a UK work permit. Manucho received a work permit soon after returning to Manchester United for pre-season training in July 2008, and made his debut for the club in the League Cup against Middlesbrough on 23 September 2008. Short of first team opportunities at Old Trafford, however, on 16 January 2009 he joined Hull City on loan until the end of the 2008–09 season. Having failed to break into the Manchester United first team, Manucho joined Real Valladolid in July 2009.

He was also a member of the Angolan national team, representing them at four Africa Cup of Nations tournaments.

Club career

Early career
Manucho began his football career at Flaminguinhos, a small youth football club from Terra Nova, Luanda, where he lived. Under the guidance of his coach and father, Alberto Gonçalves, Manucho plied his trade as a left winger, becoming one of the club's top stars.

Upon turning professional, Manucho signed for Benfica de Luanda, a mid-table club in the Angolan league. He then moved to Luanda-based side Petro Atlético, where he initially struggled to break into the team due to the presence of striker Flávio Amado. After Flávio joined Egyptian side Al Ahly, Manucho began to establish himself in the side, scoring 16 goals in 2006 and 15 in 2007.

Manchester United
On 21 December 2007, it was announced that Manucho had agreed to sign for English Premier League champions Manchester United. He joined the club in January 2008 on a three-year contract. Prior to the announcement, Manucho had been on a three-week trial with the Manchester club, during which he managed to impress United manager Sir Alex Ferguson enough to earn himself a contract.

Panathinaikos (loan)
On 31 January 2008, it was reported that Manucho was due to head out on loan to Greek team Panathinaikos for the remainder of the 2007–08 season, due to complications obtaining a work permit, with a view to him gaining valuable first team experience. United manager Alex Ferguson announced on 1 February 2008 that Manucho had indeed been loaned out to Panathinaikos until the end of the season. The loan period began soon after Angola's elimination from the 2008 Africa Cup of Nations by Egypt.

Manucho scored on his league debut for Panathinaikos in a 2–0 home win over Larissa. Panathinaikos finished the Super League Greece 2007–08 season in third place, qualifying the team for a play-off for the remaining European places. Manucho scored three goals in this six-game mini tournament, helping Panathinaikos to top the play-off group and qualify for the second qualifying round of the 2008–09 UEFA Champions League.

Return to Manchester United
At the end of the 2007–08 season, Manucho returned to Manchester United for pre-season training and the club's summer tour of South Africa. However, he had picked up a suspected metatarsal injury and was unable to play a part in the pre-season programme. In August 2008, the club confirmed that they had re-applied for a work permit for Manucho so that he could play for them. On 28 August 2008, the Manchester Evening News reported that Manucho had received a work permit earlier that summer, which was confirmed on the official website. Manucho was handed the number 26 shirt for the 2008–09 season. Although it was claimed he was carrying an injury and would not feature, he made his competitive first team debut as a substitute on 23 September 2008 in a League Cup Third Round tie at home to Middlesbrough. The game ended 3–1 to Manchester United. Manucho made his Premier League debut for Manchester United on 15 November 2008, coming on as a 74th-minute substitute for Carlos Tevez in a home match against Stoke City. Ten minutes after coming on, Manucho was involved in the build-up to United's fourth goal by Danny Welbeck. On 18 December 2008, Manucho scored his first goal in a Manchester United shirt, heading home Magnus Eikrem's cross to earn United's reserve side a 1–1 draw against Everton in a Reserve League North match.

Hull City (loan)
Having found first team opportunities hard to come by at Manchester United, on 16 January 2009 Manucho agreed to join Hull City on loan until the end of the 2008–09 season. He received a renewed work permit later that day and appeared as a substitute in a 3–1 home defeat by Arsenal on 17 January. On 4 March 2009, he scored his first Premier League goal, a last-minute winner for Hull City in a 1–0 away victory at Fulham.

Real Valladolid
After his loan spell with Hull, Manucho was deemed surplus to requirements at Manchester United, and on 17 July 2009, the club agreed a deal with Real Valladolid for the player's transfer. He signed a five-year contract with the Spanish club and was presented as a Real Valladolid player on 20 July 2009. After joining Valladolid, Manucho promised to score forty goals in a season for the club; he scored five in his first season. On 13 September 2009, he scored his first goal for the club in a 4–2 defeat against Valencia. Then he had to wait until 5 December 2009 for his next goal which earned them a vital point away to title challengers Sevilla.

Bucaspor (loan)
In summer 2010, Manucho signed with Bucaspor on a loan deal from Real Valladolid. He made his debut on 23 August at 0-0 against Kasımpaşa S.K. His next game on 28 August 2010, Manucho scored his first goal against Gençlerbirliği. On 22 November 2010, Manucho scored and provided an assist for Musa Aydın in a 5–2 loss against Turkish champion Fenerbahçe. Despite the loss, Manucho was the hero when he scored a winning goal against Fenerbahçe in a 3–2 win to send the club through to the Turkiye Kupasi on 21 December 2010. This match turned out to be last appearance for Bucaspor. Later, the agreement at the club has been terminated unilaterally over the circuit between the payment of claims.

Manisaspor (loan)
Manucho signed end of January 2011 with another Turkish team Manisaspor until the end of the season. He made his debut for Manisaspor in 3–1 loss against Fenerbahçe on 5 February 2011. On the final season of the Turkey League on 14 May 2011, Manucho made his last appearance for the club when he provided assist for Murat Erdoğan in a 4–2 win over his former team, Bucaspor, whom he had played for earlier in the season.

Rayo Vallecano
On 13 June 2014, Manucho signed a one-year deal with Spanish team Rayo Vallecano.

Cornellà
On 18 September 2018, Manucho signed for Spanish third division team UE Cornellà.

International career
Manucho plays international football for Angola. He was a member of the Angolan squad during his nation's successful qualification campaign for the 2008 African Cup of Nations.

In January 2008, he was named in the Angolan squad for the 2008 African Cup of Nations in Ghana. He scored the opening goal in Angola's first game against South Africa, and struck a further two goals in their second match against Senegal in a 3–1 win. On 4 February, Manucho scored Angola's only goal in a 2–1 loss to Egypt. Although the result meant Angola were knocked out of the tournament, Manucho's 25-yard effort was described as "the goal of the tournament so far". At the end of the tournament, Manucho was included in the "Best XI", a team of the best players in each position.

In the 2010 Africa Cup of Nations, he scored from the penalty spot in the opening game for Angola in the 4–4 draw with Mali.

In the 2012 Africa Cup of Nations, he scored a long-range effort against Burkina Faso. In Angola's next match, Manucho scored a brace in a 2–2 draw against Sudan. In Angola's next match against Ivory Coast, Manucho couldn't save the team to go to the Quarter Final of African Cup Of Nations as Ivory Coast beat Angola 2–0. Despite Angola's elimination in the group stage, Manucho's three goals meant he finished as the tournament's joint-top scorer, along with Houssine Kharja of Morocco, Christopher Katongo and Emmanuel Mayuka of Zambia, Pierre-Emerick Aubameyang of Gabon, Didier Drogba of Ivory Coast and Cheick Diabaté of Mali.

International goals
Scores and results list Angola's goal tally first.

Honours
Rayo Vallecano
Segunda División: 2017–18
Angola
COSAFA Cup runner-up: 2006
Individual

 Girabola Top Scorer: 2006, 2007
 African Cup of Nations top goal scorer: 2012

References

External links

Girabola.com - Manucho Gonçalves 

1983 births
Living people
Footballers from Luanda
Angolan footballers
Angolan expatriate sportspeople in Spain
Association football forwards
Atlético Petróleos de Luanda players
Premier League players
Manchester United F.C. players
Hull City A.F.C. players
Super League Greece players
Panathinaikos F.C. players
La Liga players
Segunda División players
Real Valladolid players
Rayo Vallecano players
Süper Lig players
Bucaspor footballers
Manisaspor footballers
Angola international footballers
2008 Africa Cup of Nations players
2010 Africa Cup of Nations players
2012 Africa Cup of Nations players
2013 Africa Cup of Nations players
Angolan expatriate footballers
Expatriate footballers in England
Expatriate footballers in Greece
Expatriate footballers in Spain
Expatriate footballers in Turkey
UE Cornellà players
Segunda División B players
Angolan expatriate sportspeople in England
Angolan expatriate sportspeople in Turkey
Angolan expatriate sportspeople in Greece
S.L. Benfica (Luanda) players